The 2008 Indonesia Independence Cup (also known as Pertamina Independence Cup 2008) was held at the Gelora Bung Karno Stadium in Jakarta, Indonesia. It was the 8th time the championship had been played since its inception in 1985. It marked the first time since 2000 that the championship was being held.

The tournament was played between 21–29 August and included national teams from  Cambodia, Libya U-23, Myanmar and Brunei DPMM FC, as well as, two teams from the host nation, the Indonesia national team and the Indonesia U-21 national team. Teams from Europe, United States and Japan had been invited but declined to participate due to the timing of the event.

The final game ended in controversy as the Libyan team refused to return to the field for the second half although leading 1 - 0.  The Libyan team walked out following an incident between two coaches from each team. As a result, Indonesia was awarded 3 goals and declared the winner of the tournament.
The Libyan team  accused a member of the Indonesia team of hitting Libya coach Gamal Adeen Nowara in the tunnel at halftime.

Teams

Stadiums

Group stages
All times local (UTC+7)

Group A

Group B

Knockout stages
All times local (UTC+7)

Knockout map

Semi finals

Finals

Third Place

Winners

External links
 Recap of 2008 Indonesia Independence Cup

References

Indonesia Independence Cup
Independence
2008–09 in Libyan football
2008 in Burmese football
2008 in Cambodian football
2008 in Brunei football